Chorionic villi are villi that sprout from the chorion to provide maximal contact area with maternal blood.

They are an essential element in pregnancy from a histomorphologic perspective, and are, by definition, a product of conception. Branches of the umbilical arteries carry embryonic blood to the villi. After circulating through the capillaries of the villi, blood returns to the embryo through the umbilical vein. Thus, villi are part of the border between maternal and fetal blood during pregnancy.

Structure

Villi can also be classified by their relations:
 Floating villi float freely in the intervillous space. They exhibit a bi-layered epithelium consisting of cytotrophoblasts with overlaying syncytium (syncytiotrophoblast).
 Anchoring (stem) villi stabilize mechanical integrity of the placental-maternal interface.

Development
The chorion undergoes rapid proliferation and forms numerous processes, the chorionic villi, which invade and destroy the uterine decidua and at the same time absorb from it nutritive materials for the growth of the embryo. They undergo several stages, depending on their composition.

Until about the end of the second month of pregnancy, the villi cover the entire chorion, and are almost uniform in size—but after then, they develop unequally.

Microanatomy

The bulk of the villi consist of connective tissues that contain blood vessels. Most of the cells in the connective tissue core of the villi are fibroblasts. Macrophages known as Hofbauer cells are also present.

Clinical significance

Use for prenatal diagnosis

In 1983, an Italian biologist named Giuseppe Simoni discovered a new method of prenatal diagnosis using chorionic villi.

Stem cell
Chorionic villi are a rich source of stem cells. Biocell Center, a biotech company managed by Giuseppe Simoni, is studying and testing these types of stem cells. Chorionic stem cells, like amniotic stem cells, are uncontroversial multipotent stem cells.

Infections
Recent studies indicate that the chorionic villi may be susceptible to bacterial and viral infections. Recents findings indicate that ureaplasma parvum can infect the chorionic villi tissues of pregnant women, thereby impacting pregnancy outcome. DNA from JC polyomavirus and Merkel cell polyomavirus has been detected in chorionic villi from pregnant women and women affected by miscarriage. DNA from BK polyomavirus has also been detected in the same tissues but to a lesser extent.

Early miscarriage

In early miscarriage, the finding of chorionic villi in vaginal expulsions is often the only definite confirmation that there was an intrauterine pregnancy rather than an ectopic pregnancy.

Additional images

See also
 Villitis of unknown etiology

References

External links
 http://www.med.umich.edu/lrc/coursepages/M1/embryology/embryo/06placenta.htm

Embryology